Hanna-Barbera Studios Europe Ltd. (HBSE, formerly Great Marlborough Productions and previously known as Cartoon Network Studios Europe and Cartoon Network Development Studio Europe) is a British animation studio based in London and owned by the Warner Bros. Television Studios UK division of Warner Bros. International Television Production, a subsidiary of Warner Bros. Discovery International. It is the EMEA arm of Cartoon Network Studios.

On April 7, 2021, it was announced that the studio had re-branded as Hanna-Barbera Studios Europe, paying tribute to the original American studio, founded by Academy Award and Emmy Award winners William Hanna and Joseph Barbera on July 7, 1957. The Hanna-Barbera name had previously been revived on some Warner Bros. Animation series and films based on the classic franchises, including from the fifth to thirteenth Scooby-Doo direct-to-video animated films, The Jetsons & WWE: Robo-WrestleMania!, the 2017 reboot of Wacky Races and Yabba Dabba Dinosaurs.

The first projects to be greenlit under the new name were a new series and a movie relating to The Amazing World of Gumball.

Filmography

Television series

Pilots

Films

Logos

See also 

 Cartoon Network Studios, American sister studio of the company.
 Hanna-Barbera
 Warner Bros. Discovery EMEA
 Chop Socky Chooks
 The Cramp Twins
 Fat Dog Mendoza
 Hero: 108
 Robotboy

References

External links 
 Finn Arnesen
 Turner Broadcasting commissions first series from its European Development Studio
 New and adventurous design
 Boulder Media Enters ‘The Amazing World of Gumball’

 
2007 establishments in the United Kingdom
British animation studios
British companies established in 2007
Cartoon Network
Companies based in London
Film production companies of the United Kingdom
Mass media companies established in 2007
Turner Broadcasting System Europe
Warner Bros. Discovery EMEA
Warner Bros. Discovery subsidiaries

Warner Bros. divisions